Bloomfield Run is a  long 2nd order tributary to Oil Creek in Crawford County, Pennsylvania.

Course
Bloomfield Run rises on the South Branch French Creek divide in Bloomfield Township, Pennsylvania.  Bloomfield Run then flows south-southeast through the Erie Drift Plain to Oil Creek at Riceville, Pennsylvania.

Watershed
Bloomfield Run drains  of area, receives about 46.1 in/year of precipitation, has a topographic wetness index of 470.16 and is about 51% forested.

References

Additional Images

Rivers of Pennsylvania
Rivers of Crawford County, Pennsylvania